Alfred Gideon "Bill" Gilbert (March 13, 1868 – December 17, 1927) was an American professional baseball player who played two games for the Baltimore Orioles during the  season.

He was born in Baltimore, Maryland and died there at the age of 59.

External links

1868 births
1927 deaths
Major League Baseball pitchers
Baseball players from Baltimore
Baltimore Orioles (NL) players
Rome Romans players
19th-century baseball players
People from Havre de Grace, Maryland